is a former Japanese football player.

Playing career
Omata was born in Suginami, Tokyo on September 1, 1983. He joined J1 League club FC Tokyo from youth team in 2002. On April 6, he debuted as substitute defender from extra time against JEF United Ichihara. However he could not play at all in the match after the debut. Although he was loaned to J2 League club Omiya Ardija in 2004, he could not play at all in the match. In 2005, he returned to Tokyo. However he could not play at all in the match. In 2006, he moved to J2 club Shonan Bellmare. He became a regular player as left side back soon and played all 47 matches except 1 match for suspension in 2006. He played as regular player in 2007 too. In 2008, he moved to Cerezo Osaka. However he could not play many matches for repeated injuries. In 2012, he moved to Avispa Fukuoka. He played many matches in 2 seasons. He retired end of 2013 season.

Club statistics

References

External links

1983 births
Living people
Association football people from Tokyo
Japanese footballers
J1 League players
J2 League players
FC Tokyo players
Omiya Ardija players
Shonan Bellmare players
Cerezo Osaka players
Avispa Fukuoka players
Association football defenders